Beacon Valley is a neighborhood located within the Mitchells Plain urban area of the City of Cape Town in the Western Cape province of South Africa. It is located in the central eastern part of Mitchells Plain just north and north east of Micheals Plain Town Centre.

References

Suburbs of Cape Town